Beni Zemmour is a Arab  tribe  descendant of Banu Hilal It is part of the Tadla confederacy.

See also 
Tadla
Beni Hassan
Beni Ahsen
Rahamna
Maqil

References

Arab tribes in Morocco